See Tira for other sites with similar names. 

Al-Tira was a Palestinian village in the Ramle Subdistrict. It was depopulated during the 1948 Arab–Israeli War on July 10, 1948, by the Alexandroni and Armored (Eighth) brigades under Operation Dani. It was located 12 km northeast of Ramla. al-Tira was mostly destroyed with the exception of a few houses survived destruction.

History
Archeological remains from Early Bronze Age,   Iron Age II, Hellenistic and Roman era have been found.

A wine-press, dating to late Roman or early Byzantine  era have been excavated, together with a cistern, dating from the pre-Byzantine era.

Crusader era remains have been found, together with remains from the Mamluk era.

Ottoman era
In 1517, Tira was incorporated into the Ottoman Empire along with the rest of Palestine, and by 1596 it was a part of the nahiya ("subdistrict") of Ramla, which was under the administration of the liwa ("district") of Gaza. A village of 26 households and 3 bachelors, an estimated 160 persons,  Muslims. They  paid a fixed tax rate of 25% on agricultural products, such as wheat, barley, vineyards, fruit trees, beehives, and goats, a total of 6,800 akçe.

In 1863, Victor Guérin noted Al-Tira situated about 2 kilometres south of Qula, and containing five hundred inhabitants. Guérin also found here "caves and a tomb cut in the rock; also, still standing, the door of an ancient house, its two jambs formed of great cut stones covered by a splendid block forming the lintel, and formerly decorated by mouldings, now effaced." An Ottoman village list from about the same year  (1870) indicated 54 houses and a population of 385, though  the population count included men, only.

In 1882,  the PEF's Survey of Western Palestine described it as: "A mud village of moderate size, with cactus hedges, situated at the edge of the plain, the hills rising behind; on the west, by the high road, is a good well, with remains of masonry."

In 1896 the population of  Et-tire  was estimated to be about 210 persons.

British Mandate era
In the 1922 census of Palestine conducted by the British Mandate authorities, Tireh  had a population of 705, all  Muslims,  increasing in the 1931 census to 892, still all Muslims, in a total of 225 houses.

An elementary school was founded in 1922, and by 1947–48, it had an enrollment of 110 boys and 22 girls.

In  the 1945 statistics   the population was 1,290, all Muslims,  while the total land area was 6,956 dunams, according to an official land and population survey. Of  this,  78  were allocated  for plantations and irrigable land, 5,551  for cereals, while 45 dunams were classified as built-up areas.

al-'Umari Mosque was one of the notable landmarks.

1948, and aftermath
The village became  depopulated on July 10, 1948, after a military assault by the Israeli army.  On the same day, Operation Danny headquarter ordered the Yiftach Brigade to  blow up most of Innaba and Al-Tira, leaving only houses enough for a small garrison.

The Israeli settlements of Tirat Yehuda, Giv'at Ko'ah and  Bareket are all on the land of Al-Tira.

In 1992 the village site was described: "The site, situated next to  paved road, is partly deserted and overgrown with a variety of trees, such as olive, date palm, fig and gum trees. The rubble of some of the destroyed houses is visible.
A number of stone houses survive, however; some are deserted, others are occupied by Israelis, and still others are used as stables for livestock. A deserted house, fenced in with barbed wire, has high, round-arched windows and a flat roof; the yard is overgrown with untended grass. One of the occupied houses is quite modest. It has a rectangular door and window and a flat roof; date-palm and other trees grow on two sides. A second, larger, occupied house has two stories and a wide porch, and is also surrounded by trees. A third is also quite large and has two stories; a side stairway leads to a second-floor porch and there is a large, round arched entrance on the first floor. There are some destroyed houses inside the settlement of Bareqet. Some of the surrounding  land is planted in grapes and kiwi fruit."

References

Bibliography

 (p.378)

 
 
 

 

al-Qawuqji, F. (1972): Memoirs  of al-Qawuqji, Fauzi in Journal of Palestine Studies 
  "Memoirs, 1948, Part I" in 1, no. 4 (Sum. 1972): 27-58., dpf-file, downloadable
 "Memoirs, 1948, Part II" in 2, no. 1 (Aut. 1972): 3-33., dpf-file, downloadable

External links
Welcome To al-Tira
al-Tira (Ramla), Zochrot
Survey of Western Palestine, Map 14:  IAA, Wikimedia commons 
Israeli map of al-Tira in 1948: NLI

Arab villages depopulated during the 1948 Arab–Israeli War
District of Ramla